Si Phum is a tambon (subdistrict) of Mueang Chiang Mai District, in Chiang Mai Province, Thailand. In 2014 it had a population of 15,271 people.

Administration

Central administration
The tambon has no administrative villages (mubans).

Local administration
The subdistrict is covered by the city (thesaban nakhon) Chiang Mai (เทศบาลนครเชียงใหม่)

References

External links
Thaitambon.com on Si Phum

Tambon of Chiang Mai province
Populated places in Chiang Mai province